Jason Tobin, credited in Chinese as To Jun Wai (杜俊緯), is a Hong Kong-British film and television actor best known for his work in the lead role of Young Jun in the Cinemax series Warrior.

Early life and education
Tobin was born in Hong Kong, where he attended the King George V School in Kowloon. He also attended boarding schools in the UK. His father is English and his mother is Chinese. After graduating high school, he moved to Los Angeles to pursue an acting career.

Career
Tobin has appeared in over twenty films and television productions. His breakout film was Better Luck Tomorrow by Justin Lin, starring alongside Parry Shen, Sung Kang, Roger Fan and John Cho, which debuted at Sundance Festival. In New York Magazine, critic Bilge Ebiri described enjoying "...one crackerjack performance, in Jason Tobin’s unbridled portrayal of a hyper, horny, and confused brat." Featuring the adventures of four overachievers, the film is widely praised for breaking the model minority stereotype of Asian Americans on screen. 17 years later, LA Times named it the best Asian American film of all time, as judged by 20 Asian American critics and curators.

Tobin was one of several Better Luck Tomorrow cast members alongside Sung Kang to appear in the Fast & Furious franchise movies starting with The Fast and the Furious: Tokyo Drift, where he portrayed one of Han's crew members and Sean's friend named Earl. He later reprised the character in F9. Both films were also directed by Justin Lin. 

He stars as the main character Eddy Tsai in the Asian American "serial killer" film Chink, directed by Stanley Yung, written by Koji Steven Sakai and produced by Quentin Lee. The film also stars Eugenia Yuan and Tzi Ma. For his performance in Chink (re-titled as #1 Serial Killer), Tobin won a "Best Actor" or "Breakout Performance for an Actor" award at the 2013 Los Angeles Asian Pacific Film Festival. Tobin also received a "Best Actor - Dramatic" award at the 2015 Los Angeles Asian Pacific Film Festival for his performance in the film Jasmine (2015).

In 2018, he once again reunited with director Justin Lin to star in the Cinemax series Warrior, a martial arts drama based on an original idea by the late Bruce Lee and produced by his daughter Shannon Lee. The Hollywood Reporter described Tobin "as a source of both unpredictable line-readings and humor", while The New York Times pointed out his charismatic performance. The series was renewed for a second season.

In February 2021, Tobin was cast as William Pan in the Netflix film Fistful of Vengeance. It was released on February 17, 2022.

Personal life
Tobin resides in Hong Kong and London, England. He has a wife and three children. 

He is an admirer of Bruce Lee "because he's the ultimate badass and he inspired me as a kid." He is a member of the Screen Actors Guild, AFTRA and Equity.

After filming season one of Warrior, Tobin was diagnosed with prediabetes and was close to having Type 2 diabetes. In order to improve his health, he changed his diet and training by working with ATP Fitness, which helped him become physically fit and mobile for his role as Young Jun. Tobin successfully reversed his prediabetes and managed his blood sugar level before filming Warrior season two.

Filmography

Film
{| class="wikitable sortable"
|-
! Year
! Title
! Role
! class="unsortable" | Notes
|-
| 1998
| Yellow 
| Yo-Yo 
| Directed by Chris Chan Lee
|-
| 2002
| Better Luck Tomorrow| Virgil Hu
| Directed by Justin Lin
|-
| 2005
| House of Fury| Rocco's fighter
| Directed by Stephen Fung
|-
| rowspan="3"| 2006
| Rob-B-Hood 
| Debt Collector 
| Directed by Benny Chan
|-
| The Heavenly Kings 
| Sandy
| Directed by Daniel Wu
|-
| The Fast and the Furious: Tokyo Drift| Earl
| Directed by Justin Lin and written by Chris Morgan
|-
| 2012
| Chink 
| Eddy Tsai
| Directed by Stanley Yung, written by Koji Steven Sakai, produced by Quentin Lee (Winner of Best Actor Award at the 2013 Los Angeles Asian Pacific Film Festival)
|-
| 2015
| Jasmine| Leonard To 
| Directed and written by Dax Phelan (Winner of Best Actor - Dramatic Award at the 2015 Los Angeles Asian Pacific Film Festival)
|-
|2015
|Pound of Flesh|Liam
|Directed by Ernie Barbarash
|-
| 2019
| Sonora: The Devil's Highway 
| Lee Wong
| Directed by Alejandro Springall, written by Guillermo Munro Palacio and John Sayles
|-
| 2021
| F9| Earl
| Directed by Justin Lin, written by Justin Lin and Daniel Casey
|-
| 2022
| Fistful of Vengeance| William Pan
| Directed by Roel Reiné, written by Cameron Litvack, Jessica Chou and Yalun Tu
|}

Television

Awards
Best Actor, Chink (also known as #1 Serial Killer), 2013 Los Angeles Asian Pacific Film Festival
Best Actor - Dramatic, Jasmine'', 2015 Los Angeles Asian Pacific Film Festival
Best Actor - Jasmine, 2016 London Independent Film Awards
Best Actor - Jasmine, 2017 International Independent Film Awards

References

External links

Year of birth missing (living people)
Hong Kong emigrants to England
English male film actors
English male television actors
Hong Kong male film actors
Hong Kong male television actors
Living people
Hong Kong people of English descent
British male actors of Chinese descent
Alumni of King George V School, Hong Kong